David Hannan may refer to:

 David Hannan (cinematographer), Australian cinematographer
 David Hannan (artist) (born 1971), Métis Canadian artist
 Dave Hannan (born 1961), Canadian ice hockey left winger